B. Suresha is an Indian film director, producer, screenwriter, and actor who works in Kannada-language films. He is known for directing the films Artha (2003) and Puttakkana Highway (2011).

Career 
B. Suresha made his debut as a child actor with Ghatashraddha (1977) before working with Shankar Nag as an assistant director on several ventures including Accident (1985) and Malgudi Days (1986). He worked as a script writer notably collaborating with Ravichandran in 1993. He also worked as a television serial director and worked on Hosa Hejje (1991), Sadhane on Doordarshan and Naaku Thanthi. He made his directorial debut with Tapori and went on to work on several films including Puttakkana Highway (2011). In 2008, he returned to acting with Slum Bala. In 2016, his film Devara Naadalli based on a Times of India article released. That same year, he announced the launch of a new entertainment channel called Rangoli. 2017 saw the release of Uppina Kagada, which was about the journey of a young girl searching for her father. As an actor, he has worked on K.G.F: Chapter 1 (2018) and Ananthu vs Nusrath (2018). Outside of films, he has also written books.

Personal life 
He married Shylaja Nag in 1992; he had previously worked with her during the play Macbeth in 1988. They manage a production studio named Media House. The studio has produced several films namely Naanu Nanna Kanasu (2010), Sakkare (2013), and Yajamana (2019).

Filmography 
As a director, producer, writer

As an actor
Ghatashraddha (1977)
Slum Bala (2008)
Jugaari (2010)
Puttakkana Highway (2011)
Tuglak (2012)
Jatta (2013)
Ulidavaru Kandanthe (2014)
Benkipatna (2015)
Endendigu (2015)
Plus (2015)
Badmaash (2016)
K.G.F: Chapter 1  (2018)
Ananthu vs Nusrath (2018)
Manaroopa (2019)
ACT 1978 (2020)
K.G.F: Chapter 2  (2022)
Kranti  (2023)

Television 
As director
Hosa Hejje (1991)
Sadhane  
Naaku Thanthi

Awards and nominations

References

External links 

Kannada screenwriters
Kannada film directors
Living people
Kannada film producers
Film producers from Karnataka
Actors in Kannada cinema
1962 births